After relegation to the Third Tier of Scottish Football, Ayr United play in the Second Division with Airdrie United, Alloa Athletic, Brechin City, Dumbarton, East Fife, Forfar Athletic, Livingston, Peterhead and Stenhousemuir. Ayr regained First Division status following promotion via the play-offs, in which Ayr secured a 7–4 aggregate win over Forfar Athletic and a 3–2 aggregate win over Brechin City. Ayr also enjoyed respectable cup runs, progressing to the Quarter-Finals of the Challenge Cup, before being defeated away to Partick Thistle and reaching the Fifth Round of the Scottish Cup, with victories over Junior side, Sunnybank and SPL club, Hibernian before being knocked out by St Mirren of the SPL respectively, However failed to progress beyond Elgin City of the Scottish Football League Third Division in the League Cup.

Kit 
In the aftermath of relegation Ayr United changed kit makers from Surridge Sports to global sportswear giants Nike. The Main shirt sponsor, Paligap, remained the same. The Home Kit with the traditional White with Black trimmings used with either Black or white shorts, The Away kit with Black and Gold trimmings used with black shorts and socks and the Third kit a Red shirt used with either Black or White shorts and socks.

For a complete pictorial history of Ayr United playing kit, see footnote

Competitions

Pre season

Other Fixtures 

After numerous years of Service Kilmarnock veteran Garry Hay was awarded with a testimonial match against local neighbours, Ayr United. Mehdi Taouil scored two goals, Craig Bryson with one and Garry Hay the other (penalty). Ironically Ayr's goal came from former Killie player Mark Roberts, Who in his previous game for Ayr scored a hat-trick of penalties against East Fife.

Cup Draws 
Shortly after the 2009–10 season the draws for the Challenge Cup (Airdrie away) and the Co-operative Cup (Elgin City away) were made. After Victory against Airdrie in the Challenge Cup Ayr United were given a Home Draw against Fife Side Cowdenbeath. The third round draw was made and Ayr United were drawn away to Partick Thistle. In November the Draw for the Scottish Cup draw was made and Ayr were granted a home tie against Junior side Sunnybank. After comfortably beating Sunnybank, Ayr were rewarded with an away draw with SPL club, Hibernian. After defeating Hibs in a replay, a fifth round tie against another SPL side, St Mirren (at Home) awaited, in which the Paisley club won.

 Ayr United score first

The Challenge Cup ties was arranged to be played at the Excelsior Stadium, Airdrie but due to the fact Airdrie United hadn't completed laying their artificial turf, The SFL granted Airdrie the permission to move the venue to Clackmannanshire side Alloa Athletic's stadium Recreation Park, because of its synthetic pitch. (Alloa were playing away to Dundee in the Cup). A week after, Ayr United made the way up to Elgin, for the first time since July 1979. Ayr scored first, then Elgin scored two quick goals. Aaron Connelly scored the first goal of his career. Elgin City scored 40 seconds before the tie went to penalties. After two defeats in both the Co-Operative cup and league Ayr had a second round tie with, First Division side, Cowdenbeath, in which Ayr ran out surprise winners. However Ayr were knocked out in the next round by Glasgow Club Partick Thistle. As November approached Ayr entered the Scottish Cup and faced Aberdeen Junior team, Sunnybank. A game that Ayr easily won 5–0 with goals from loan-signing Stuart Bannigan, two goals from the Penalty spot, A header and a sublime over-head kick from Andy Rodgers. An Away draw against SPL side, Hibernian awaited Ayr. Ayr drew 0–0 in the Capital. But were victorious in a replay. United were knocked out in the fifth round by SPL club, St Mirren, by two goals to one.

Fixtures

August 

On the opening day of the Season, Brechin City made the journey to Somerset Park and took all three points. Ayr made the first away trip of the season to Airdrie United. Ayr went two-nil up with two goals from Mark Roberts. David Crawford was sent off, and Airdrie were awarded a penalty (from which they scored). Airdrie also had two players sent off. With his red card David Crawford was suspended for the home game against Dumbarton. Alan Main had to play in the goals (as a trialist) and did again against Peterhead at home as well.

At the end of August, Ayr had only picked up five points from four games (winning against Dumbarton at home and drawing with Airdrie United and Peterhead). Ayr United sat seventh in the Second Division, five points adrift from league leaders Livingston and two points from a play-off spot.
Average Home Attendance: 1,184
Total Average Attendance: 1,170

September 

Ayr United started September with a trip to Alloa to play Alloa Athletic. Ayr were convincingly beaten by their hosts, by Four-Goals to One. The following week Ayr United travelled to Methil, Fife to face East Fife, In a game which saw four penalties awarded (all but one being awarded to Ayr). Mark Roberts scored all three, becoming the first ever Ayr United player to do so in the 100-year history of the club. The following week Ayr played host to Stenhousemuir in which they were comfortable two-nil winners.
Average Home Attendance: 1,065
Total Average Attendance: 790

October 

October began on a high as the League Leaders Livingston made the journey to the West coast and were convincingly beaten 3–1 after taking the lead through Liam Fox but was cancelled out by goals from Eddie Malone and Mark Roberts. Ayr's next fixture wasn't as good as they were beaten by conceded three penalties and had Dean Keenan and Ross Robertson sent off. The Next visitors to Somerset Park were Alloa Athletic who were beaten Goals from Mark Roberts and an Own-Goal, Claimed by Scott McLaughlin. Ayr's Next Away trip was to Peterhead. Where Ayr were comfortable 4–2 Winners with goal from Mark Roberts, Alan Trouten, Ryan McCann and Daniel McKay.
Average Home Attendance: 1,223
Total Average Attendance: 887

November 

Ayr started the month victorious over rivals Airdrie United, when former diamond Scott McLaughlin scored a late winner against his old team. Ayr were not quite as fortunate as they were beaten 3–2 away to bottom club Dumbarton. The Next week saw Ayr face junior side Sunnybank in the Scottish Cup, which Ayr won with goals from Stuart Bannigan, Two from Mark Roberts scored two and Andy Rodgers who also scored twice. Ayr fixture with East Fife that was due to take place on the 27/11/2010 but was postponed due to the Referee strike.
Average Home Attendance: 1,439
Total Average Attendance: 1,125

December 
None of Ayr United's fixtures scheduled to take place in December went ahead due to the big freeze.

January 

Average Home Attendance: 1,210
Total Average Attendance: 1,040

February 

Average Home Attendance: 1,165
Total Average Attendance: 1,165

March

April

May

Play-offs

Final League Table

Changes to the squad 
After relegation to the Second Division many players parted ways with the club, such as Tam McManus, who later joined Falkirk, Craig Samson, who joined St Mirren in the SPL, and Stephen Grindlay re-joined one of his former clubs Dumbarton. Scott Agnew and David Mitchell went to the Third Division to play with Stranraer, as did Kevin Cawley, who joined East Stirlingshire and Andy Aitken who joined his home town club Annan Athletic. However, manager Brian Reid brought in David Crawford, who was voted the Player of the Year at Alloa Athletic the season before and Ryan McWilliams from Greenock Morton as goalkeepers. Chris Smith and Bobby Donnelly were signed at the back, but were later joined by Eddie Malone and the well-experienced Jim Lauchlan. Alan Trouten and Scott McLaughlin were signed from Airdrie United as did Ryan McCann later in the campaign, Stephen McKeown was also signed but only played 6 games before his contract was terminated after a bust up with the management. Andy Rodgers was signed from East Stirlingshire and Michael Moffat joined in January from Junior side Girvan. Reid also brought in players such as Stephen Reynolds (from St Johnstone) and Daniel McKay (from Kilmarnock) in on Loan. Also Jonathan Tiffoney, Ross Robertson, Roddy Patterson, Shaun Kelly and Aaron Connelly (who joined Annan Athletic and later Girvan on loan).

In

Out

Current squad 
As of 3 June 2010

(Vice-Captain)

(On loan from Partick Thistle)
(On loan from Hibernian)

 (On loan from Dunfermline Athletic)
 (On loan to Girvan)

(Club Captain)

Appearances 
These statistics include League, Challenge Cup, League Cup and Scottish Cup for every player to have played for Ayr United during the 2010–11 season.

Non-Playing staff 

 Chairman- Lachlan Cameron
 Vice Chairman- Alex Ingram
 Manager- Brian Reid
 Assistant manager- Scott MacKenzie
 Physiotherapist- Kevin MacLellan
 Fitness coach- David Johnston
 Groundsman- David Harkness
 Kit manager- Malcolm Boyle
 Programme editor- Duncan Carmichael
 Club photographer- David Sargent
 Ayr World administrator- Willie Craig

References 

Ayr United
Ayr United F.C. seasons